Ryu Han-Su (born February 1, 1988) is a South Korean Greco-Roman wrestler who competes in the 66 kg division. He entered Kyungsung University's Department of Sports and Health in 2006. He reached the final of the 2013 World Wrestling Championships in the same division and also won the gold medal.

References

External links
 

1988 births
Living people
Kyungsung University alumni
South Korean male sport wrestlers
Place of birth missing (living people)
Asian Games medalists in wrestling
Wrestlers at the 2014 Asian Games
World Wrestling Championships medalists
Asian Games gold medalists for South Korea
Wrestlers at the 2016 Summer Olympics
Olympic wrestlers of South Korea
Medalists at the 2014 Asian Games
Wrestlers at the 2018 Asian Games
Medalists at the 2018 Asian Games
Asian Wrestling Championships medalists
Wrestlers at the 2020 Summer Olympics
Sportspeople from Daegu
21st-century South Korean people